The Union of Brest  was the 1595–96 decision by the majority of Eastern Orthodox hierarchs in the Ruthenian lands of the Polish–Lithuanian Commonwealth to transfer their ecclesiastical jurisdiction from the Ecumenical Patriarchate of Constantinople to the jurisdiction of the Holy See. The Eparchy of Mukachevo that was located in the Kingdom of Hungary was left out of the process. The union established the Ruthenian Uniate Church, which currently exists as the Ukrainian Greek Catholic Church, and the Belarusian Greek Catholic Church.

The union

Background 
Rome-oriented Christians and their Byzantium-oriented counterparts formally  severed connections from 1054. Subsequent attempts to unify Eastern Orthodox believers and the  Catholic Churches were made on several occasions, including an instance in 1452 in which the deposed Metropolitan of Kyiv  Isidore (in office from 1437 to 1441) endorsed the 1439 Union of Florence and formally promised the unity of the Ruthenian Orthodox Church with Rome.

In 1588–1589, Patriarch of Constantinople Jeremias II traveled across Eastern Europe, particularly the Polish–Lithuanian Commonwealth and the Grand Duchy of Moscow, where he finally  acknowledged the Russian Orthodox Church in Moscow (estranged from Constantinople since the 1440s) and consecrated Patriarch Job of Moscow as the Eastern Orthodox All-Russian Patriarch (a dignity previously held by Isidore of Kyiv from 1437 to 1441). Patriarch Jeremias II deposed the  Metropolitan of Kyiv  and with the approval of the King of Poland  Sigismund III consecrated Michael Rohoza as the new Metropolitan of Kyiv, Halych, and all Rus'.  (Jeremias was notably imprisoned by the Ottomans and by the Muscovites, and was forced to elevate the see of Moscow to a patriarchy.)

Negotiations 
After Patriarch Jeremias II left Muscovy in 1589, four out of nine bishops of the Eastern Orthodox Church in the Ruthenian lands of the Polish–Lithuanian Commonwealth gathered in synod in the city of Brest. They signed a declaration of their readiness to reunite with Rome. The 33 Articles of Union were accepted by the Pope in Rome. At first widely successful, the Union lost some of its initial support within the following several decades, mainly due to its enforcement on the  Orthodox parishes, which provoked several massive uprisings.

List of bishops who did not initially accept the union
 Metropolitan of Kiev and all Rus'
 Archeparch of Polotsk–Vitebsk
 Bishop of Smolensk
 Bishop of Volodymyr–Brest
 Bishop of Przemyśl-Sambir-Sanok (adopted the union in 1692),

List of bishops who in 1590 signed the declaration of intent
 Bishop of Luck and Ostrog — Kyrylo Terletskyi (exarch of Ecumenical Patriarch of Constantinople)
 Bishop of Pinsk and Turow — Leontiy Pelchytskyi
 Bishop of Chelm — Dionisiy Zbyruiskyi
 Bishop of Lwow — Hedeon Balaban

List of bishops who later joined the agreement
 Bishop of Przemysl — Mykhailo Kopystenskyi
 Archbishop of Polock — Herman Zahorskyj (acting)
 Bishop of Volodymyr-Brest — Hypatius Pociej
 Metropolitan of Kiev and all Rus' — Michael Rohoza

At the request of Prince Konstanty Wasyl Ostrogski, Hypatius Pociej left his post of Greater Castellan of Brześć Litewski and accepted the King's appointment to the eparchy of Volodymyr-Brest. Prince Konstanty Wasyl Ostrogski considered that the Metropolitan of Kyiv should reach an agreement with the eastern patriarchs, the Patriarch of Moscow, and Metropolis of Moldavia and Bukovina for joint participation in agreement with the Latin Church.

In 1595, both Hedeon Balaban and Mykhailo Kopystenskyi withdrew their signatures from the agreement. That same year the Archbishop of Polotsk, Nathaniel Sielitskyi, died, and was replaced with Herman Zahorksyi.

Proclamation 
The union was solemnly and publicly proclaimed in the Hall of Constantine in the  Vatican. Canon Eustachy Wołłowicz, of Vilnius, read in  Ruthenian and in Latin the letter of the Ruthenian episcopate to the Pope, dated 12 June 1595. Cardinal Silvio Antoniani thanked the Ruthenian episcopate in the name of the Pope, and expressed his joy at the happy event. Then Hipacy Pociej, Bishop of Volodymyr, in his own name and that of the Ruthenian episcopate, read in Latin the formula of abjuration of the 1054 Greek Schism, Bishop Cyril Terlecki of Lutsk read it in Ruthenian, and they affixed their signatures. Pope Clement VIII then addressed to them an  allocution, expressing his joy and promising the Ruthenians his support. A medal was struck to commemorate the event, with the inscription: . On the same day the bull  was published, announcing to the Roman Catholic world for the first time that Ruthenians were in the unity of the Roman Church. The bull recites the events which led to the union, the arrival of Pociej and Terlecki at Rome, their abjuration, and the concession to the Ruthenians that they should retain their own rite, save for such customs as were opposed to the purity of Catholic doctrine and incompatible with the communion of the Roman Church. On 7 February 1596, Pope Clement VIII addressed to the Ruthenian episcopate the brief , enjoining the convocation of a synod in which the Ruthenian bishops were to recite the profession of the Catholic Faith. Various letters were also sent to the Polish king, princes, and magnates, exhorting them to receive the Ruthenians under their protection. Another bull, dated 23 February 1596, defined the rights of the Ruthenian episcopate and their relations in subjection to the Holy See.

Terms 
It was agreed that the formulation filioque should not be inserted in Ruthenians' Nicene Creed, and that the Ruthenians "should remain with that which was handed down to us in the Holy Scriptures, in the Gospel, and in the writings of the holy Greek Doctors, that is, that the Holy Spirit proceeds, not from two sources and not by a double procession, but from one origin, from the Father through the Son." The bishops asked to be dispensed from the obligation of introducing the Gregorian Calendar, so as to avoid popular discontent and dissensions, and insisted that the king of Poland should grant them, as of right, the dignity of senators.

Outcomes 

The union was strongly supported by the King of Poland and Grand Duke of Lithuania, Sigismund III Vasa, but opposed by some bishops and prominent nobles of Rus, and (perhaps most importantly) by the nascent Cossack movement for Ukrainian self-rule. The result was "Rus fighting against Rus", and the splitting of the Church of Rus into Greek Catholic and Greek Orthodox jurisdictions. The greatest noble to oppose it was Konstanty Wasyl Ostrogski. In 1620, the Metropolis of Kiev, Galicia and all Ruthenia was erected under the care of the Patriarchate of Constantinople for dissenting Eastern Orthodox faithful. This resulted in parallel successions of metropolitans to the same ecclesiastical title in the territory of the Commonwealth.

See also 
 Union of Uzhhorod
 Synod of Polotsk
 History of Christianity in Ukraine
 Jeremi Wiśniowiecki
 Eastern Catholic liturgy
 Theological differences between the Catholic Church and the Eastern Orthodox Church
 Ecclesiastical differences between the Catholic Church and the Eastern Orthodox Church

Further reading 

 Gudziak, B. A. (2001). Crisis and Reform: The Kyivan Metropolitanate, the Patriarchate of Constantinople, and the Genesis of the Union of Brest (Harvard Series In Ukrainian Studies). Cambridge: Harvard Ukrainian Research Institute.
 Chynczewska-Hennel, T. (2002). The Political, Social, and National Thought of the Ukrainian Higher Clergy, 1569-1700. Harvard Ukrainian Studies, 26(1/4), 97–152. 
 Dmitriev, M. V. (2011). Conflict and Concord in Early Modern Poland: Catholics and Orthodox at the Union of Brest. In H. Louthan, G. B. Cohen, & F. A. J. Szabo (Eds.), Diversity and Dissent: Negotiating Religious Difference in Central Europe, 1500-1800 (NED-New edition, 1, pp. 114–136). Berghahn Books. 
 

 Tatarenko, L. (2005). La naissance de l’Union de Brest: La curie romaine et le tournant de l’année 1595. Cahiers Du Monde Russe, 46(1/2), 345–354.
 Zema, V. (2011). Edificatory Prose of the Kyivan Metropolitanate: Between the Union of Florence and the Union of Brest. Harvard Ukrainian Studies, 32/33, 853–871.

Notes

References

External links 

 The text
 FAMILY TREES of priests of the Byzantine-rite church in SLOVAKIA 1650-2006
 At the Service of Church Unity

1595 in Europe
16th-century Eastern Catholicism
1590s in the Polish–Lithuanian Commonwealth
16th century in Belarus
Eastern Christianity in Belarus
16th century in Ukraine
History of Christianity in Ukraine
History of Brest, Belarus
Eastern Orthodoxy in the Polish–Lithuanian Commonwealth
Eastern Catholicism in the Polish–Lithuanian Commonwealth
Ruthenian Uniate Church
History of Eastern Catholicism
16th-century Eastern Orthodoxy
Conversion to Catholicism
1595-06